Suntan lotion can refer to:

Indoor tanning lotion, used to increase tanning
Sunscreen, prevent sunburn, premature aging, and skin cancer